SoloQuest is a tabletop role-playing game adventure for RuneQuest. Originally published by Chaosium in 1982, it was republished in 2018 in PDF format as part of Chaosium's RuneQuest: Classic Edition Kickstarter. The republished edition, titled SoloQuest Collection contained the original three adventures, plus SoloQuest 2: Scorpion Hall and SoloQuest 3: The Snow King's Bride.

Contents
SoloQuest is a supplement of three adventures for a solo player character: "DreamQuest," "Phony Stones," and "Maguffin Hunt."

Reception
Forrest Johnson reviewed SoloQuest in The Space Gamer No. 55. Johnson commented that "SoloQuest is not the best solo adventure booklet around, but if you play RuneQuest there is not much competition."

Clive Bailey reviewed SoloQuest for White Dwarf #37, giving it an overall rating of 9 out of 10, and stated that "Overall, I found this adventure pack easy and enjoyable to play."

Trevor Graver reviewed Soloquest for Imagine magazine, and stated that "Soloquest is a nice addition the Runequest family."

Reviews
Different Worlds #27 (March, 1983)

References

External links
 

Role-playing game supplements introduced in 1982
RuneQuest adventures